Naguilian may refer to the following places in the Philippines:

Naguilian, Isabela
Naguilian, La Union
Naguilan barangay in Calayan, Cagayan